The South Ferry Plaza, also called A Lighthouse At The Tip Of The Island, was a supertall skyscraper proposed in 1987 to rise right next to the East River on Manhattan Island in New York City. It was designed by architect Fox & Fowle Architects and Leslie E. Robertson Associates. The architects designed the building for office use and the skyscraper incorporated recycled marble and steel with glass in its structure. The architectural plan had a glass dome that was supposed to be lit at night, which also contained an observation deck and three restaurants located inside the dome. In addition, the project called for the renovation of the South Ferry Terminal, including the train station so it can accommodate 100,000 people. The project would have doubled the size of Battery Park if it had proceeded, since the building included a plaza that was planned to tie in with Battery Park via a new promenade at the tip of Manhattan. The project was canceled in 1991 because of a lack of funding.

See also
List of tallest buildings in New York City

References

Unbuilt buildings and structures in New York City
Skyscrapers in Manhattan
South Ferry (Manhattan)